Valley County is a county in the U.S. state of Nebraska. As of the 2010 United States Census, the population was 4,260. Its county seat is Ord.

In the Nebraska license plate system, Valley County is represented by the prefix 47 (it had the 47th-largest number of vehicles registered in the county when the license plate system was established in 1922).

History
Valley County was formed in 1871 and organized in 1873. Its name derives from the local terrain: much of the county consists of valley land lying between the North and Middle Loup Rivers.

On June 12, 2010, the privately owned Bredthauer Dam broke due to heavy rain, flooding rural Valley County and the village of North Loup. Major flooding occurred in the village, with water "eight inches deep and running down Main Street."  North Loup was evacuated for the flood's duration.

Geography
The North Loup River flows southeastward through the upper portion of the county, while the Middle Loup River runs southeastward through the lower portion. The terrain consists of rolling hills. The flat river valleys are largely dedicated to agriculture, with some center pivot irrigation employed.

Major highways

  Nebraska Highway 11
  Nebraska Highway 22
  Nebraska Highway 58
  Nebraska Highway 70

Protected area
 Fort Hartsuff State Historical Park
 Scotia Canal State Wildlife Management Area

Adjacent counties

 Wheeler County – northeast
 Greeley County – east
 Sherman County – south
 Custer County – west
 Garfield County – north

Demographics

As of the 2000 United States Census, there were 4,647 people, 1,965 households, and 1,298 families in the county. The population density was 8 people per square mile (3/km2). There were 2,273 housing units at an average density of 4 per square mile (2/km2). The racial makeup of the county was 98.15% White, 0.15% Black or African American, 0.32% Native American, 0.11% Asian, 0.06% Pacific Islander, 0.80% from other races, and 0.41% from two or more races. 1.61% of the population were Hispanic or Latino of any race.

There were 1,965 households, out of which 28.00% had children under the age of 18 living with them, 58.70% were married couples living together, 5.10% had a female householder with no husband present, and 33.90% were non-families. 31.00% of all households were made up of individuals, and 17.90% had someone living alone who was 65 years of age or older. The average household size was 2.32 and the average family size was 2.93.

The county population contained 24.70% under the age of 18, 4.80% from 18 to 24, 22.60% from 25 to 44, 23.90% from 45 to 64, and 24.00% who were 65 years of age or older. The median age was 44 years. For every 100 females there were 91.70 males. For every 100 females age 18 and over, there were 90.50 males.

The median income for a household in the county was $27,926, and the median income for a family was $35,571. Males had a median income of $25,224 versus $17,217 for females. The per capita income for the county was $14,996. About 10.10% of families and 12.80% of the population were below the poverty line, including 16.30% of those under age 18 and 12.70% of those age 65 or over.

Communities

City
 Ord (county seat)

Villages
 Arcadia
 Elyria
 North Loup

Unincorporated communities
 Olean
 Sumter

Townships

 Arcadia
 Davis Creek
 Elyria
 Enterprise
 Eureka
 Geranium
 Independent
 Liberty
 Michigan
 Noble
 North Loup
 Ord
 Springdale
 Vinton
 Yale

Politics
Valley County voters are strongly Republican. In only one national election since 1916 has the county selected the Democratic Party candidate.

See also
 National Register of Historic Places listings in Valley County, Nebraska

References

 
1873 establishments in Nebraska
Populated places established in 1873